KLOW (98.9 FM, Trumpet Radio) is a radio station broadcasting a contemporary Christian music format. Licensed to Reno, Texas, United States, the station serves the Paris, Texas area. The station is owned by Vision Media Group, Inc.

References

External links

LOW
2009 establishments in Texas
Radio stations established in 2009